Susannah Glanville-Hearson known professionally as Susannah Fielding is an English actress. She won the 2014 Ian Charleson Award for her portrayal of Portia in The Merchant of Venice at the Almeida Theatre. She also starred in the CBS sitcom The Great Indoors. Since 2019, she has co-starred with Steve Coogan in This Time with Alan Partridge.

Early life and education
Fielding was born in Poole, England, and grew up in Havant, near Portsmouth, before spending two years boarding at Christ's Hospital school in Sussex, where she developed an interest in acting. She also attended Dynamo Youth Theatre, a youth theatre for 11- to 18-year-olds in Havant. She trained at the Guildhall School of Music and Drama; her performances there included Trinculo in The Tempest (directed by Patsy Rodenburg) and Myrrah in Tales from Ovid (directed by Christian Burgess). She graduated from Guildhall in 2006.

Career

Theatre
Fielding's first four professional roles in theatre were in four productions at the National Theatre: The Rose Tattoo (2007), Philistines (2007), Much Ado About Nothing (2007) and The Hour We Knew Nothing of Each Other (2008). She received an Ian Charleson Award Commendation for her role as Pietra in Ibsen's An Enemy of the People at the Sheffield Crucible in 2010 alongside Antony Sher.

In 2011 she played Portia in Rupert Goold's production of The Merchant of Venice for the Royal Shakespeare Company alongside Sir Patrick Stewart as Shylock, reprising the role in the production's transfer to the Almeida Theatre in 2014. In 2012, she was cast as Kim for the UK run of All New People, a black comedy play written by and starring Zach Braff. The play's UK run included Manchester and Glasgow before culminating in a 10-week run in London's Duke of York's Theatre. Fielding played the role of Evelyn Williams in the musical American Psycho at the Almeida Theatre in December 2013.

Fielding won the 2014 Ian Charleson Award for her reprised portrayal of Portia in The Merchant of Venice at the Almeida Theatre. Michael Grandage, one of the four judges, said of her performance in the production, set in a Las Vegas casino, that she had made the familiar role her own, with a "faultless American accent and a huge intelligence in her acting choices".

Television
In 2008 she appeared in "Firewall", the second episode of the BBC TV series Wallander. 2009 saw Fielding as a guest on The Bill, playing Rochelle Chapman. In 2010 she appeared in the Doctor Who episode "Victory of the Daleks", as well as an episode of Midsomer Murders and Comedy Lab. She played Chloe in the Channel 4 sitcom Pete versus Life. In 2016 Susannah played Emma (Murray's colleague who has a crush on him) in I Want My Wife Back. In 2016, she appeared in "Nosedive", an episode of the anthology series Black Mirror. She had a recurring role  in 2016–2017 in the American sitcom The Great Indoors as Brooke, the ex-girlfriend and current boss of Jack (Joel McHale), who must help him transition from an adventurous reporter to an office worker.

In 2019, she co-starred with Steve Coogan in This Time with Alan Partridge. A second series of the show aired in 2021.

Film
Fielding appeared in the 2010 films 4.3.2.1. and 1st Night (originally titled Cosi), for which she learned to sing opera in Italian. In 2011 she starred in Kill Keith, a comedy horror film featuring Keith Chegwin. She appeared in the 2012 romantic comedy The Knot alongside Mena Suvari and Noel Clarke. She played the beautiful Katherine, Poirot's deceased former lover in the film Death on the Nile (2022).

Personal life
Fielding dated English actor Tom Hiddleston from 2008 to 2011. They met while filming the series Wallander.

Acting credits

Film

Television

Theatre work

Video games

References

External links

Living people
English stage actresses
English television actresses
English film actresses
People from Havant
People educated at Christ's Hospital
Alumni of the Guildhall School of Music and Drama
English Shakespearean actresses
21st-century English actresses
Ian Charleson Award winners
People from Poole
1985 births